A three-part referendum on a marine reserve was held in Easter Island on 3 September 2017. Voters were asked whether they approved of the creation of a marine reserve, whether it should be jointly administered by a board of six Easter Islanders and five officials representing the national government, and whether fishing in the marine reserve should be limited to traditional methods. The proposals were the result of a November 2013 decree by the Chilean government that started the process of creating a 740,000 square kilometre marine reserve around Easter Island. All three proposals were approved by voters.

Results

References

2017 in Chile
Easter
Referendums in Easter Island